Horizon is a 1979 album by jazz pianist McCoy Tyner released on the Milestone label. It was recorded in April 1979 and features performances by Tyner with alto saxophonist Joe Ford, tenor saxophonist  George Adams, violinist John Blake, bassist Charles Fambrough, drummer Al Foster and percussionist Guilherme Franco.

Reception
The Allmusic review by Michael G. Nastos states "Tyner realizes a perfectly balanced, extroverted, compatible and utterly unique front line. It enables him to offer some of the most remarkable, memorable and powerful music of his career".

Track listing
All compositions by McCoy Tyner except where noted
 "Horizon" - 12:01
 "Woman of Tomorrow" (Blake) - 7:41
 "Motherland" (Blake)  7:17
 "One for Honor" (Fambrough) - 4:29
 "Just Feelin'" - 7:44
 "Horizon" [alternate take] - 11:46 Bonus track on 2007 reissue

Personnel
McCoy Tyner: piano
Joe Ford: alto saxophone (track 3), soprano saxophone (tracks 1, 5 & 6), flute (track 2)
George Adams: tenor saxophone (tracks 1, 3, 5 & 6), flute (track 2)
John Blake: violin (tracks 1-3, 5 & 6)
Charles Fambrough: bass
Al Foster: drums
Guilherme Franco: congas (tracks 1-3, 5 & 6)

References

McCoy Tyner albums
1979 albums
Milestone Records albums
Albums produced by Orrin Keepnews
Albums recorded at Van Gelder Studio